The mixed doubles tennis event at the 2017 Summer Universiade was held from August 24 to 29 at the Taipei Tennis Center in Taipei, Taiwan.

Erina Hayashi and Kaito Uesugi won the gold medal, defeating Simona Parajová and Ivan Košec in the final, 7–5, 6–4.

Chan Yung-jan and Hsieh Cheng-peng, and Jada Hart and Logan Staggs won the bronze medals.

Seeds
All seeds receive a bye into the second round.

Main draw

Finals

Top half

Section 1

Section 2

Bottom half

Section 3

Section 4

References
Main Draw

Mixed doubles